is a Japanese manga artist who turned the real-life stories of North Korean kidnappings of Japanese citizens into manga. He also supervised the film Megumi, based on one of his manga.

Works
Dakkan
Megumi
Mugen Senkan Yamato (Fantastic Battleship Yamato)
R (Reverse) Shitei
When My Mother Was Kidnapped I Was One

References

External links
 

1960 births
Manga artists
North Korean abductions of Japanese citizens
Living people